Elections in India in 1977 included Legislative Assembly (Vidhan Sabha) elections in several Indian states, including Goa, Himachal Pradesh, Jammu and Kashmir, Tamil Nadu, and West Bengal.

Legislative Assembly elections

Bihar

Goa, Daman and Diu

|- align=center
!style="background-color:#E9E9E9" class="unsortable"|
!style="background-color:#E9E9E9" align=center|Political Party
!style="background-color:#E9E9E9" |Seats contested
!style="background-color:#E9E9E9" |Seats won
!style="background-color:#E9E9E9" |Number of Votes
!style="background-color:#E9E9E9" |% of Votes
!style="background-color:#E9E9E9" |Seat change
|-
| 
|align="left"|Maharashtrawadi Gomantak Party||29||15||116,339||38.49%|| 3
|-
| 
|align="left"|Indian National Congress||27||10||87,461||28.94%|| 9
|-
| 
|align="left"|Janata Party||30||3||69,823||23.10%|| 3
|-
| 
|align="left"|Independents||57||2||28,022||9.27%|| 1
|-
|
|align="left"|Total||145||30||302,237||||
|-
|}

Haryana

Himachal Pradesh

Source

Jammu and Kashmir

Elections for the Indian state of Jammu and Kashmir were held in June 1977, which are generally regarded as the first 'free and fair' elections in the state. 
Jammu & Kashmir National Conference, newly revived from the former Plebiscite Front, won an overwhelming majority and re-elected Sheikh Abdullah as the Chief Minister.

Kerala

Madhya Pradesh

Source:

Nagaland

Odisha

Punjab

Rajasthan

Tamil Nadu

The sixth legislative assembly election of Tamil Nadu was held on June 10, 1977. All India Anna Dravida Munnetra Kazhagam (AIADMK) won the election defeating its rival Dravida Munnetra Kazhagam (DMK). M. G. Ramachandran (M.G.R), the AIADMK founder and a leading Tamil film actor, was sworn in as Chief Minister for the first time. The election was a four cornered contest between the AIADMK, DMK, the Indian National Congress (INC) and the Janata Party. Earlier on 17 October 1972, M.G.R had founded the AIADMK following his expulsion from the DMK after differences arose between him and DMK leader M. Karunanidhi. On 31 January 1976, Karunanidhi's government was dismissed by the central government of Prime Minister Indira Gandhi citing corruption charges against Karunanidhi and President's rule was imposed on the state. Karunanidhi had been at odds with Indira Gandhi over his opposition to Emergency and allied with Janata Party founded by Jayaprakash Narayan. Meanwhile, M.G.R had developed a close relationship with Indira Gandhi and supported the Emergency. M.G.R remained as Chief Minister until his death in 1987, winning the next two elections held in 1980 and 1984.

|-
! style="background-color:#E9E9E9;text-align:left;vertical-align:top;" |Alliance/Party
!style="width:4px" |
! style="background-color:#E9E9E9;text-align:right;" |Seats won
! style="background-color:#E9E9E9;text-align:right;" |Change
! style="background-color:#E9E9E9;text-align:right;" |Popular Vote
! style="background-color:#E9E9E9;text-align:right;" |Vote %
! style="background-color:#E9E9E9;text-align:right;" |Adj. %‡
|-
! style="background-color:#009900; color:white"|AIADMK+ alliance
! style="background-color: " | 
| 144
| +142
| 5,734,692
|style="text-align:center;vertical-align:middle;" colspan=2 | 33.5%
|-
|AIADMK
! style="background-color: #008000" |
| 130
| +130
| 5,194,876
| 30.4%
| 35.4%
|-
|CPI(M)
! style="background-color: #000080" |
| 12
| +12
| 477,835
| 2.8%
| 33.0%
|-
|FBL
! style="background-color: #800000" |
| 1
| –
| 35,361
| 0.2%
| 62.0%
|-
|IND
! style="background-color: olive" |
| 1
| –
| 26,620
| 0.2%
| 42.9%
|-
! style="background-color:#FF0000; color:white"|DMK
! style="background-color: " |
| 48
| -136
| 4,258,771
|style="text-align:center;vertical-align:middle;" colspan=2 | 24.9%
|-
|DMK
! style="background-color: #FF0000" |
| 48
| -136
| 4,258,771
| 24.9%
| 25.3%
|-
! style="background-color:#00FFFF; color:black"|Congress alliance
! style="background-color: #00FFFF" |
| 32
| +24
| 3,491,490
|style="text-align:center;vertical-align:middle;" colspan=2 | 20.4%
|-
|INC
! style="background-color: #00FFFF" |
| 27
| +27
| 2,994,535
| 17.5%
| 20.8%
|-
|CPI
! style="background-color: #0000FF" |
| 5
| -3
| 496,955
| 2.9%
| 20.4%
|-
! style="background-color:yellow; color:black"|Janata
! style="background-color:yellow" |
| 10
| +10
| 2,851,884
|style="text-align:center;vertical-align:middle;" colspan=2 | 16.7%
|-
|JNP
! style="background-color: #FFFF00" |
| 10
| +10
| 2,851,884
| 16.7%
| 16.8%
|-
! style="background-color:gray; color:white"|Others
! style="background-color:gray" |
| 1
| -7
| 751,712
|style="text-align:center;vertical-align:middle;" colspan=2 | 4.4%
|-
|IND
! style="background-color: #666666" |
| 1
| -7
| 751,712
| 4.4%
| –
|-
| style="text-align:center;" |Total
! style="background-color: " |
| 234
| –
| 17,108,146
| 100%
| style="text-align:center;" | –
|-
|}
‡: Vote % reflects the percentage of votes the party received compared to the entire electorate that voted in this election. Adjusted (Adj.) Vote %, reflects the % of votes the party received per constituency that they contested.
Sources: Election Commission of India'''

Tripura

Uttar Pradesh

West Bengal

Legislative Assembly elections were held in the Indian state of West Bengal on 14 June 1977. The polls took place after the ousting of Indira Gandhi's government at the Centre. The Left Front won a landslide victory, much to the surprise of the left parties themselves. The 1977 election marked the beginning of the 34-year Left Front rule in West Bengal, with Communist Party of India (Marxist) leader Jyoti Basu leading the first Left Front cabinet.

References

Sources

External links

 Election Commission of India

1977 elections in India
India
1977 in India
Elections in India by year